Peter King (born 1983) is an Irish Gaelic footballer who played as a left corner-back for the Tipperary senior team.

Born in Ballina, County Tipperary, King first arrived on the inter-county scene at the age of seventeen when he first linked up with the Tipperary minor team before later joining the under-21 side. He joined the senior panel during the 2005 championship. King immediately became a regular member of the starting fifteen and won one Tommy Murphy Cup medal.

At club level King is a one-time championship medallist with Monaleen.

King retired from inter-county football following the conclusion of the 2007 championship.

Honours

Player

Monaleen
Limerick Senior Football Championship (1): 2010

Tipperary
Tommy Murphy Cup (1): 2005

References

1983 births
Living people
Ballina Gaelic footballers
Monaleen Gaelic footballers
Tipperary inter-county Gaelic footballers